or sometimes Mount Horoshiri is located in the Hidaka Mountains, Hokkaidō, Japan. Its name was derived from a phonetic kanji transcription of the Ainu words for "great mountain", poro-shiri. It is the highest mountain in the Hidaka range, and is one of the 100 famous mountains in Japan.

Climbing route

Nukabira course
The  course is a two-day course.

The cottage is maintained by the Biratori Alpine Club and sits 950 m above sea level.

From there it is a 1 km (30 minute) walk to Mount Naka Tottabetsu. The route then descends 3 km (2 hours) to the Mount Poroshiri Mountain Cottage.

Niikappu River course
From the dam the trail goes to a survey cabin along the Poroshiri River and then onto the mountain ridge before ascending to the summit.

References

 Shyun Umezawa, Yasuhiko Sugawara, and Jun Nakagawa, Hokkaidō Natsuyama Gaido 4: Hidaka Sanmyaku no Yamayama (北海道夏山ガイド4日高山脈の山やま), Sapporo, Hokkaidō Shimbunshya, 1991. 

Poroshiri